Filiscala is a genus of small sea snails, marine gastropod molluscs in the family Epitoniidae, commonly known as wentletraps.

Species
Species within the genus Filiscala include:
 Filiscala raricosta (Lamarck, 1804)
 Filiscala youngi (Kilburn, 1985)
Species brought into synonymy
 Filiscala martinii (W. Wood, 1828): synonym of Filiscala raricosta (Lamarck, 1804)

References

  Brown L.G. & Neville B.D. (2015). Catalog of the recent taxa of the families Epitoniidae and Nystiellidae (Mollusca: Gastropoda) with a bibliography of the descriptive and systematic literature. Zootaxa. 3907(1): 1-188

Epitoniidae